In health care, person-centered care is a practice in which patients actively participate in their own medical treatment in close cooperation with their health professionals. Sometimes relatives are also included in creating the health plan. The person-centered model of health care is used both for in and outpatient settings, emergency care, palliative care as well as in rehabilitation.

Background 
The concept of person-centered care can be distinguished from a traditional treatment model which views the patient as a passive receiver of a medical intervention. Many health professionals are traditionally focused on the needs of the patients instead of their resources. Rather than the conventional way of making medical recommendations from health professionals to a patient, the person-centered care model allows for the inclusion of the patient and their relatives in making a joint design and mutual agreement on the medical plans and treatments. The overall perspective of the life situation of the patient is considered to create objectives and strategies for both short- and long-term monitoring.

The concept of person-centered care has grown to be internationally associated with successful outcomes in health care. Initially, the method was developed for senior patients and patients with intellectual disabilities but the ideas have later spread to other medical fields.

Within person-centered care, the patient is considered an independent and capable individual with their own abilities to make informed decisions. Autonomy and participation are  emphasized and respected. For the patient, the person-centered approach allows for involvement and extended possibilities to take responsibility for their own health and treatment.

Key principles 
There are four vantage points that constitute the foundation of person-centered care:
 The health care should be based on the unique person's needs and his or her right to health
 The health institution should focus on the abilities of the person and encourage activity
 The health care should be coherent
 Health professionals should always approach patients with dignity, compassion and respect. They should work with an ethical perspective.

Person-centered care is based on a holistic approach to health care that takes the whole person into account instead of a narrow perspective where the focus lies on the illness or the symptoms. The person-centered approach also includes the person's abilities, or resources, wishes, health and well-being as well as social and cultural factors.

According to the Gothenburg model of person centered care there are three central themes to person-centered care work: the patient's narrative, the partnership and the documentation.

The Partnership 
The health care team may consist of several different professionals with varying expertise from different health care units. The patient is a natural part of the team. Within the team, the patient and relatives have discussions with health professionals aiming to reach a mutual understanding on how to achieve safe and accurate care for the unique patient.

The Documentation 
The personal health or care plan is designed to capture the patient's narrative. A common understanding of strategies, goals and evaluation of the outcomes should be established. The documentation should clearly state the responsibilities of each member of the team, including the patient's own role and obligations. To fully live up to the person-centered care concept, patients should have full and easy access to all information and documentation about them. For reasons of security, accessibility and cost effectiveness, all documentation should be digital and include all medical records. The person's own notes, reports of health status and the overall health plan should also be carefully documented. The collected documentation is the foundation of the health care.

Person-centred care in the United Kingdom

Person-centred care is a concept used in the United Kingdom by Skills for Health, in their 2017 framework; by the Health Foundation, set out in their 2016 "quick guide"; by the Social Care Institute for Excellence; by the Royal College of General Practitioners and NHS England, who have developed a Person-Centred Care toolkit; by the Health Innovation Network South London; and by the Care Quality Commission, in their regulations for service providers.

The Health Innovation Network defines Person-centred care as:

The concept is defined as including decision-making that is shared between services users and professionals, ensuring service users have access to advocacy, providing personal budgets for people to access services, treating people with dignity, ensuring service users have all the information they need, supporting individual choices and ensuring treatment and support are personalised and take into account people's preferences. The Royal College of GPs notes that the key question is not '"what's the matter with you" but "what matters to you".

The Health Foundation states that "a commonly cited barrier is that many [service providers] believe the care they provide is already person-centred. However, the evidence shows that this is often not the case".

Person-centered care research 
Research on person-centered care is carried out in many different universities. The University of Gothenburg  Centre for Personcentred Care (GPCC), in Sweden, has been established since 2010. The center conducts interdisciplinary research funded partly by the Swedish government's investments targeted towards care sciences.

Person-centered care according to McCormack 
A conceptual framework for person-centered care has been presented by McCormack and McCance. The holistic framework by McCormack and McCance consists of four constructs; prerequisites, the care environment, person-centred processes, and expected outcomes.

Related concepts 
Patient-centered care is a concept that also emphasises the involvement of the patient and their families in the decision making of medical treatments.  A main difference is that person-centered care describes the whole person in a wider context rather than the patient-centered approach which is based on the person's role as a patient. There is a difference between the word “patient” and “person”, still there is a widespread use of the concept of patient-centered care and person-centered care as equals. The word “patient” can be defined as a person who receives treatment for a disorder or illness. Characteristic of a patient is vulnerability and dependence. To get a deeper understanding of the word “person” we need to define the philosophical concept of personhood. Personhood is linked with responsibilities and human rights, and characteristics such as rationality and consciousness. The goal of person-centered care is for the person to live a meaningful life. The concept has a more holistic focus on the person’s uniqueness in disregard to the sickness. Patient-centered care has sprung out of resistance against the paternalistic and biomedical approach to medicine.

People-centered care is an umbrella term, articulated by WHO among others, which entails the right and duty for people to actively participate in decisions at all levels of the health care systems. People-centered care focuses both on the individual's right to health, access to health care and information, but also health literacy on a collective level.

Health activation is a condition where a health care consumer is equipped, educated, and motivated to be an effective manager of their own health and use of health care services. The concepts are very similar, although person-centered care places the emphasis on the healthcare provider, whereas the term health activation is used in reference to the attitude and behavior of the patient.

Good care focus on empowerment, respect, humanization, and absence of infantilization. Good care implies, on the one hand, prevention of abuse or mistreatment, and on the other, patient-centered care. 

Good care is measured via a self-reported questionnaire. The Good Care Scale in Nursing Homes (GCS-NH)a) has been used, which is a 62-item questionnaire that assesses empowerment, respect, humanization, and non-infantilization, by measuring how strong nursing home staff agree with each statement on a scale of 0- 4.

References

Further reading 
 
Paradoxes of person-centred care: A discussion paper

Health care
Types of health care facilities